Old Mutual FC is a South Africa soccer club from Cape Town, South Africa. Old Mutual FC currently plays in the SAFA Second Division.

Notable former players
 Mark Mayambela
 Roscoe Pietersen

Club officials and technical team
Chairman:  Paul Blows
Assistant Coach:  Gerald Stober
Goalkeeper coach:  Mark Anderson (South African footballer)
Advisory board:  Ashoek Adhikari
 Bob Skinstad
Head of youth development:  Roger Links
Academy Chairman:  Dr. Busch
Academy Chief Scout:  Andy
Administration:  Ryan

References

Soccer clubs in Cape Town